Gordon Hsiao-shu Chang (born 1948) is an American historian and author. He is a professor and vice provost at Stanford University.

Early life and education 
Born in British Hong Kong, Chang earned a degree in history from Princeton University. Chang earned his PhD in history from Stanford University.

Career 
In 1991, Chang joined Stanford University. Chang is the Olive H. Palmer Professor in the Humanities and a professor of American history at Stanford University. Chang's academic interests lie in the connection between race and ethnicity in America, and American foreign relations. Chang has written on Asian-American history and US–East Asian interactions, and he also researches the fields of US diplomacy, the US-Soviet Cold War, modern China, and international security.

In 1990, Chang published his first book Friends and Enemies: The United States, China and the Soviet Union, 1948-1972. In 1997, Chang's second book was Morning Glory, Evening Shadow: Yamato Ichihashi and His Wartime Writing, 1942-1945,   about a Japanese-American professor at Stanford University who was interned during the war. Chang's other books include Asian Americans and Politics: An Exploration (2001), Chinese American Voices: From the Gold Rush to the Present (2006), Asian American Art: A History, 1850-1970 (2008), and Fateful Ties: A History of America's Preoccupation with China (2015).  

He is the author of The Coming Collapse of China in which he attempted to predict the collapse of China and claimed that it would collapse by 2011. In December 2011, he changed the timing of the year of the predicted collapse to 2012. He has not revised his prediction thereafter.

In 2015, Chang was inducted as a member of Committee of 100,  a leadership organization of Chinese Americans in business, government, academia and the arts whose stated aim is "to encourage constructive relations between the peoples of the United States and Greater China."

In April 2019, Chang became a senior associate vice provost for undergraduate education at Stanford University.

Works 
 1990 Friends and Enemies: The United States, China, and Soviet Union, 1948-1972.
 2012 The Coming Collapse of China, New York, Random House, 2001, 344 pp
 2019 Ghosts of Gold Mountain: The Epic Stories of the Chinese Who Built the Transcontinental Railroad.

Awards 
 1991 Bernath Book Prize.
 1999 Guggenheim Fellowship Award.

See also 
 Committee of 100 (United States)
 List of Guggenheim Fellowships awarded in 1999
 Yuji Ichioka

References

Sources

External links 
 Gordon H. Chang at historians.org
 Stanford bio page

 An interview with Professor Chang on KPFA's Letters and Politics

1948 births
Living people
21st-century American historians
21st-century American male writers
Hong Kong emigrants to the United States
Stanford University Department of History faculty
Princeton University alumni
Stanford University alumni
20th-century American historians
20th-century American male writers
American male non-fiction writers